Dracula 2000 (also known internationally as Dracula 2001) is a 2000 American gothic horror film co-written and directed by Patrick Lussier and produced by Joel Soisson and Wes Craven (executive producer), and starring Gerard Butler, Christopher Plummer, Jonny Lee Miller, Justine Waddell, Omar Epps, Colleen Fitzpatrick, Jeri Ryan and Jennifer Esposito. The plot follows Dracula, who arrives in New Orleans, Louisiana in the 20th century and seeks out Mary Heller, a descendant of Abraham Van Helsing.

Dracula 2000, the promotional title of which is Wes Craven Presents: Dracula 2000, builds upon Bram Stoker's original 1897 novel Dracula, with Count Dracula resurrected in contemporary America. The film was a critical and commercial failure, though two direct-to-video sequels, both written and directed by Lussier, were produced.

Plot
Matthew Van Helsing, a descendant of 19th-century Dutch physician Abraham Van Helsing, owns an antique shop built over the site of Carfax Abbey in London in 2000. One night, with Van Helsing upstairs, his secretary, Solina, allows a group of thieves, led by her boyfriend, Marcus, into the shop. The thieves infiltrate the shop's underground high-security vault and find a sealed silver coffin protected by a deadly defense system. Based on the level of security surrounding the coffin, Solina and Marcus decide that the coffin must contain valuable content, so they escape with it and flee to New Orleans. When Van Helsing discovers that the coffin has been stolen, he boards a plane to America, telling his apprentice, Simon Sheppard, to remain in London. Simon, ignoring these instructions, follows his mentor.

Aboard their plane, one of the thieves manages to open the coffin, revealing the dormant body of Count Dracula. Dracula awakens and attacks and turns the thieves and Solina, causing the plane to crash in the Louisiana swamps. Dracula survives the crash, turns news reporter Valerie Sharpe who is reporting the crash, kills her cameraman, and travels to New Orleans, where college students Mary Heller and Lucy Westerman are living. Estranged from her family, Mary has recently been experiencing nightmares of a strange, terrifying man- Dracula.

Van Helsing and Simon arrive in New Orleans and destroy the newly turned vampires left in Dracula's wake, except Solina and Marcus. Afterwards, Van Helsing reveals to Simon that he is in fact the original Abraham Van Helsing, who defeated Dracula in 1897. Because he was unable to destroy Dracula permanently, Van Helsing hid the body and prolonged his own life by regularly injecting Dracula's blood (filtered via leeches) until, one day, he could discover a way to kill Dracula permanently. Simon is intrigued as to why Dracula hates all things Christian and wonders why he is also particularly vulnerable to silver. Van Helsing also tells Simon about his daughter, Mary, whose mother took her from England after the truth about his identity came to light. Since Mary was conceived after Van Helsing began his injections, she shares blood and a telepathic link with Dracula, who senses her existence and is in New Orleans to find her.

Van Helsing and Simon try to reach Mary before Dracula does but fail to do so before Dracula turns Lucy into a vampire. Dracula and his three new brides, Solina, Lucy, and Valerie, corner Van Helsing and kill him. Simon and Mary escape, only for Dracula to capture them shortly after that. On a rooftop, Dracula transforms Mary and reveals his true identity: the Apostle Judas Iscariot, who betrayed Jesus for a bribe of thirty pieces of silver. After Jesus was crucified, Judas tried to hang himself in shame, but the rope snapped, and God cursed him to live forever as a vampire. Mary finally understands why the legendary vampire is vulnerable to silver and hates Christian iconography. Solina and Lucy appear with Simon, who has killed Valerie earlier with a stake, and Dracula tells Mary to bite him. However, Mary fakes the bite, and together she and Simon decapitate the two remaining brides. An enraged Dracula tries to throw Mary from the rooftop, but Mary wraps some cable from a large crucifix around Dracula's neck, and they both fall from the roof. Dracula hangs as he attempted to do two thousand years before, but the rope does not break this time, and he burns in the first sunlight.

Mary survives the fall and is cured of her vampirism by Dracula saying, "I release you" before he dies. In the end, she doubts whether the sun has truly killed Dracula. Embracing her heritage as a Van Helsing, she returns Dracula's ashes to the vault beneath Carfax Abbey and vows to watch over them should he ever rise again.

Cast

Production 
The initial draft was penned by producer Joel Soisson. After Harvey Weinstein purchased the screenplay, he called script doctor Scott Derrickson to tell him he had purchased the script solely on the basis of its title and thought that it "sucked". Derrickson, along with Ehren Kruger and Paul Harris Boardman, heavily rewrote the screenplay, though none are credited in the final film. It was shot in Toronto, London, New Orleans and Bayou Gauche, Louisiana.

Release 
Dracula 2000 opened at #7 in its first week at the box office with $8,636,567. In its second week, the film had a 56.5% drop-off, but hung onto the #8 spot. The film grossed $33,022,767 domestically and $14,030,858 overseas for a worldwide total of $47,053,625, failing to make back its $54 million budget. On its initial video release, it grossed an additional $32 million in the US and Canada and continues to make money worldwide. Dracula 2000 was the sixth-highest-grossing film for Miramax/Dimension Films in 2000, exceeding the box office takes of such expensive Dimension Films releases like Reindeer Games and Impostor, as well as Miramax's December opener for that year, All the Pretty Horses.

Reception 
The film received generally negative reviews from critics. Rotten Tomatoes reports a rating of 17% based on 69 reviews, with an average score of 3.59/10. The site's consensus states: "This retelling tries to offer a different spin on the origin of Dracula. Unfortunately, there's nothing here audiences haven't seen before". On Metacritic, the film has a 26 out of 100 rating, based on 14 critics, indicating "generally unfavorable reviews". Berge Garabedian of JoBlo offered a positive review, calling it "A fun vampire movie", "a novel adaptation of an old time legend", and "[good] for pretty much anyone looking for some enjoyable bloody fun". BeyondHollywood.com wrote: "Dracula 2000 is not the worst vampire movie I've seen, but it's definitely not the best either. There are some very good moments, most of them featuring the frail Van Helsing as he attempts to battle the fast and deadly vampires. Also, I appreciated the background given to Dracula's aversion to silver, crosses, and God, as well as Dracula's 'true' origins. Not bad work, but it could have been much better".

Owen Gleiberman of Entertainment Weekly gave the film a "C−" score, while James Berardinelli of ReelViews panned the film, writing: "Of all the indignities to have been visited upon Dracula during the past century (including being the "inspiration" for a cereal and a Sesame Street character, and being lampooned by Mel Brooks), none is more unsettling than what has happened to the world's most famous vampire in Dracula 2000".

Soundtrack

The film's rock and metal soundtrack includes Powerman 5000's song "Ultra Mega", Linkin Park's song "One Step Closer", Pantera's song "Avoid the Light", System of a Down's cover of Berlin's "The Metro", Slayer's song "Bloodline" and Disturbed's song "A Welcome Burden". The original score composed by Marco Beltrami was released in 2017 by Varèse Sarabande as part of the label's Little Box Of Horrors limited edition 12-disc set. The score was released separately by the label in July 2020.

Sequels
Dracula 2000 was followed by two direct-to-video sequels, Ascension in 2003 and Legacy in 2005. Series director Lussier and Joel Soisson, who co-wrote all three films, created a plot for a fourth film and discussed releasing it theatrically, but the film was not produced.

See also
 Vampire film

References

External links
 
 
 
 
 

2000 films
2000 horror films
2000s thriller films
American supernatural horror films
American horror thriller films
American vampire films
Dracula films
Dracula 2000 (film series)
Films about telepathy
Films about nightmares
Films about religion
Films set in 2000
Films set in London
Films set in New Orleans
Films shot in New Orleans
Films shot in Toronto
Cultural depictions of Judas Iscariot
Portrayals of Jesus in film
Reboot films
Religious horror films
Resurrection in film
Dimension Films films
Films scored by Marco Beltrami
Films directed by Patrick Lussier
Films with screenplays by Ehren Kruger
Films with screenplays by Joel Soisson
2000 directorial debut films
Films produced by Joel Soisson
2000s English-language films
2000s American films